John Kay McTavish (7 June 1885 – 4 April 1944) was a Scottish footballer who played for several clubs including Falkirk, Oldham Athletic, Tottenham Hotspur, Newcastle United, Partick Thistle, Dumbarton and East Stirlingshire, and for Scotland at international level.

Club career 
McTavish began his career at the Glasgow junior side Petershill before joining Falkirk in 1905, being a part of the team which finished runners-up in Scottish Division One twice (the 1907–08 and 1909–10 seasons).

In summer 1910, he joined Oldham Athletic and played 10 matches at Boundary Park before signing for Tottenham Hotspur by the end of the same year. The inside right featured in 40 games and scored twice in all competitions for the Lilywhites between December 1910 and April 1912, when he left White Hart Lane to join Newcastle United where he made a further 34 appearances and scored six goals.

He went on have spells at Partick Thistle, York City, Goole Town, Heart of Midlothian, a return to Falkirk, East Fife, Dumbarton and finally East Stirlingshire.

International career
McTavish played once for Scotland against Ireland on 19 March 1910. The match played in Belfast ended in a 1–0 victory for Ireland.

Personal life
McTavish's younger brother Bob was also a footballer and a forward whose career path took him to Petershill then Falkirk, where the siblings were teammates – although Bob's preferred position at right wing was occupied by Jock Simpson, with whom John had a noted partnership. The brothers also played together at Tottenham.

McTavish died in 1944.

References

1885 births
1944 deaths
Scotland international footballers
Scottish footballers
English Football League players
Petershill F.C. players
Falkirk F.C. players
Oldham Athletic A.F.C. players
Tottenham Hotspur F.C. players
Newcastle United F.C. players
Partick Thistle F.C. players
Bo'ness F.C. players
Heart of Midlothian F.C. players
York City F.C. (1908) players
Goole Town F.C. players
East Fife F.C. players
East Stirlingshire F.C. players
Dumbarton F.C. players
People from Govan
Footballers from Glasgow
Scottish Football League players
Scottish Football League representative players
Association football inside forwards
Scottish Junior Football Association players